Sekondi Takoradi Metropolitan Assembly is one of the fourteen districts in Western Region, Ghana. Originally it was formerly part of the then-larger Shama Ahanta East Metropolitan District in 1988, which was created from the former Sekondi Takoradi Metropolitan Authority Council, until the eastern part of the district was split off to create Shama District on 29 February 2008; thus the remaining part has been renamed as Sekondi Takoradi Metropolitan District. However on 15 March 2018, the western part of the district was split off to become Effia Kwesimintsim Municipal District; thus the remaining part has been retained as Sekondi Takoradi Metropolitan District. The metropolis is located in the southeast part of Western Region and has Sekondi-Takoradi as its capital town.

List of settlements

Sources
 
 GhanaDistricts.com

References

Districts of the Western Region (Ghana)